The Matthew Stanford Robison Memorial is a gravesite marker located in Salt Lake City Cemetery. It was designed by Matthew Stanford Robison's father Ernest.  Matthew's parents decided to make his gravesite a place of joy and inspiration. The memorial depicts a boy standing up from his  wheelchair and raising his left hand toward the sky.

Background
Matthew Stanford Robison was born on September 23, 1988 in Salt Lake City, Utah to parents Ernest and Anneke Robison. Deprived of oxygen, he was not expected to live. Because the boy did not get enough oxygen at birth, he was born blind and partially paralyzed. He died at age 10.

The Robisons started a Nonprofit organization called Ability Found in 1993 to help people with disabilities buy medical equipment. The non-profit helps those with Cerebral palsy, spina bifida, multiple sclerosis, stroke, cancer and traumatic injuries. The foundation also sells replicas of the boy's tombstone memorial.

History of Memorial
In 2000, Ernest Robison decided to make a memorial to his son. The statue on the gravesite depicts Matthew rising up out of his wheelchair and reaching skyward. 

The memorial is meant to depict the child in the afterlife, free from his earthly afflictions. 

A photo of the memorial and part of the obituary was shared on Reddit, and it went viral. The gravesite had been a Utah tourist attraction appearing on several travel websites as a place to visit.

See also
 Birth defect
 Hypoxia (medical)
 List of congenital disorders
 List of burials at Salt Lake City Cemetery
 Memorial

References

Notes

External links
Find a grave
Matthew Stanford Robison Grave

Monuments and memorials in Utah
Outdoor sculptures in Salt Lake City
Statues in Utah
Tombs in the United States